Mihovci pri Veliki Nedelji is a settlement west of Ormož in northeastern Slovenia. To the south its territory extends to the banks of the Drava River and the border with Croatia. The area traditionally belonged to the Styria region and is now included in the Drava Statistical Region.

Name
The name of the settlement was changed from Mihovci to Mihovci pri Veliki Nedelji in 1953.

Cultural heritage
The Roman road from Poetovio to Savaria ran through the settlement and a section of it survives as a regional road. Its profile was recorded by an archaeological field survey in 1963.

References

External links
Mihovci pri Veliki Nedelji on Geopedia

Populated places in the Municipality of Ormož